Several ships have been named Suffolk for the English count of Suffolk.

 was an East Indiaman of the British East India Company (EIC), for whom she made four voyages before being broken up in 1761.
 was launched at Shields. She made one voyage for the EIC in 1800-1802. Thereafter she traded widely until she was broken up in December 1844.
 was launched in 1800. She made one voyage for the EIC in 1800-1802. She grounded in 1802 but was refloated. She then made a voyage to the Cape of Good Hope. On her return she became a West Indiaman. A Spanish privateer captured her in 1805.
 was launched in 1803 at Calcutta and at some point prior to 1810 was renamed General Wellesley. She made one voyage for the EIC but an American privateer captured her in December 1814 on the outbound leg of her second EIC voyage. In January 1815 she stranded on the Charleston Bar and became a total loss.

See also
 : One of six ships of the British Royal Navy

Ship names